Mariëlle Lucienne Josepha Paul (born 5 November 1966) is a Dutch member of the House of Representatives. A member of the conservative liberal People's Party for Freedom and Democracy (VVD), she was elected to that body in the 2021 general election. She previously worked as a communications director for several multinational corporations.

Early life and corporate career
Paul was born in 1966 in the North Brabant town of Geldrop to Pakistani parents. Her father was Anglo-Indian, and her parents had moved from Karachi to the Netherlands the year before Paul's birth, when her father – a mechanical engineer – took a job at DAF. Paul grew up with a sister and moved from Geldrop to the nearby village of Heeze in 1973. She attended the secondary school Augustinianum at gymnasium level starting in 1979. She studied international law at Leiden University in the years 1985–91 and was a member of the student association Minerva.

After graduating, Paul started working for oil and gas company BP. She became a corporate communications director at public relations company Hill & Knowlton six years later. Between 2000 and 2004, she co-owned a Haarlem communication consultancy called Principal Communications, and Paul subsequently started working for the bank ABN AMRO. She was employed there for almost nine years and filled positions in marketing, communication, and HR. Paul became corporate and sales communications director at media group Sanoma in 2013. She left that company in 2015 and worked for the NGO Porticus as its interim communications director. Paul was Royal BAM Group's communications director between 2017 and her election to the House of Representatives in 2021.

House of Representatives
In the 2021 general election, she was placed 17th on the VVD's party list. Paul had previously served as member and vice chair of the board of the Amsterdam VVD. Her party won 34 seats, causing her to be elected. Paul received 2,633 preference votes and was sworn into the House of Representatives on 31 March 2021. She became her party's spokesperson for international trade, development aid, and macroeconomic policy, but her portfolio changed to primary and secondary education shortly after. Compensation for victims of the childcare benefits scandal was added later as well. Besides, Paul is part of the contact groups Germany, United Kingdom, and United States, and she is on the Committees for Education, Culture and Science; for European Affairs; for Finance; for Foreign Affairs; for Kingdom Relations (chair); and for Public Expenditure. She was one of her party's  in Amsterdam in the 2022 municipal elections.

Personal life
Paul is a resident of Amsterdam, where she had been living there for thirty years at the time of her swearing in as MP. She is single.

References

Living people
1966 births
Members of the House of Representatives (Netherlands)
Dutch people of Pakistani descent
People's Party for Freedom and Democracy politicians
Leiden University alumni
21st-century Dutch politicians
21st-century Dutch women politicians
BP people
Dutch public relations people
People from Heeze-Leende
People of Anglo-Indian descent
Politicians from Amsterdam